Zapadni Mojstir is a village in the municipality of Tutin, Serbia. According to the 2002 census, the village has a population of 505 people.

Notable people
 Ajdin Draga, Albanian politician.

References

Populated places in Raška District